The Scuderia Lancia, which later became the Squadra Corse HF Lancia, is the racing workshop of the Lancia car company, created in 1952 by Gianni Lancia, son of the brand's founder. The Scuderia Lancia officially began competing in motor sports, particularly in rallying, where it distinguished itself in the Carrera Panamericana, the Targa Florio and the Mille Miglia. The team also entered Formula 1 in 1954-1955, without particularly shining. The Squadra Corse bounced back in the World Endurance Championship with three world titles between 1979 and 1981, and in rallying, winning eleven constructors' titles and four drivers' titles between 1974 and 1992. Since the end of 1991, Lancia has ceased all official involvement in motor racing.

Rallying 
Prior to the forming of the World Rally Championship, Lancia took the final International Championship for Manufacturers title with the Fulvia in 1972. In the WRC, they remain the most statistically successful marque (despite having withdrawn at the end of the 1993 season), winning constructors' titles with the Stratos (1974, 1975 and 1976), the 037 (1983) and the Delta (six consecutive wins from 1987 to 1992). The Delta is also the most successful individual model designation ever to compete in rallying. All this gave Lancia a total of 10 championships over the years.

Juha Kankkunen and Miki Biasion both won two drivers' titles with the Delta. Among other drivers to take several World Rally Championship wins with Lancia were Markku Alén, Didier Auriol, Sandro Munari, Bernard Darniche, Walter Röhrl, Björn Waldegård and Henri Toivonen. The history of the brand in rallying is also tainted with tragedy, with deaths of Italian driver Attilio Bettega at the 1985 Tour de Corse in a Lancia 037 and then Finnish championship favourite Toivonen in a Lancia Delta S4 at the same rally exactly a year later. These deaths would eventually lead to the end of Group B rallying.

Martini Racing 
In 1982, just as they had done one year previously with sports cars, Martini Racing signed with the works Lancia team, sponsoring the brand new Group B Lancia 037, with Attilio Bettega and Markku Alén as drivers. The Lancia Martini partnership in the World Rally Championship was one of the company's longest, remaining until the end of the 1992 season, with several cars, including the Group B Delta S4 and Group A Delta Integrale winning events and titles with drivers such as Juha Kankkunen, Bruno Saby, Massimo Biasion and Didier Auriol. The Martini Lancia cars won the WRC Drivers' title in 1987 and 1991 with Kankkunen, and 1988 and 1989 with Biasion, as well as the Constructors' title with the 037 in 1983, and consecutively with the Group A Delta from 1987 to 1992. In 1993, Martini managed a smaller sponsorship program, restricted to the Italian Rally Championship with Italian rallyman Dario Cerrato

Competition results

Rallying

WRC Results (Group B era)

WRC Results (Group A era)

Formula One

World Championship Grand Prix results 
Includes results of Lancia Grand Prix cars entered by other entities.

* Constructor's Championship not awarded until .

† Indicates shared drive

Non-Championship results 
(results in bold indicate pole position; results in italics indicate fastest lap)

Titles 

 International Championship for Manufacturers – 1 (1972)
 World Rally Championship for Manufacturers – 10 (1974, 1975, 1976, 1983, 1987, 1988, 1989, 1990, 1991 and 1992)
 World Rally Championship for Drivers – 5 (Sandro Munari in 1977, Juha Kankkunen in 1987 and 1991, and Miki Biasion in 1988 and 1989)

See also 

 Lancia in motorsport
 Martini Racing
 Rallying in Italy

References

External links 

 Lancia, all-time team statistics

World Rally Championship teams
Lancia in motorsport
Formula One entrants
Auto racing teams established in 1952
Auto racing teams disestablished in 1992
Italian auto racing teams